"So Long" is a song by American producer Diplo featuring American country singer Cam, released as a single through Mad Decent on April 24, 2019. It is the first in a planned series of collaborations with country music artists by Diplo under (part of) his real name, Thomas Wesley. The lyric video was released the same day as the song.

Promotion
A lyric video was uploaded by Diplo to his official YouTube channel on April 24, 2019.

Track listing

Charts

Release history

Notes

References

2019 singles
2019 songs
Diplo songs
Cam (singer) songs
Songs written by Sasha Alex Sloan
Songs written by Cam (singer)
Songs written by Diplo
Songs written by Hardy (singer)
Songs written by Tyler Johnson (musician)
Songs written by Wynter Gordon
Songs written by King Henry (producer)